A social networking service is an online platform that people use to build social networks or social relationships with other people who share similar personal or career interests, activities, backgrounds or real-life connections.

This is a list of notable defunct social networking services that have Wikipedia articles.

References

 
Social networking defunct
Defunct social networking services